Alatyr is a rural locality (a village) under the administrative jurisdiction of the town of oblast significance of Pervomaysk of Nizhny Novgorod Oblast, Russia.

References

Rural localities in Nizhny Novgorod Oblast
Pervomaysk Urban Okrug